This article provides details of international football games played by the Kuwait national football team from 2000 to 2009.

Results

2000

2001

2002

2003

2004

2005

2006

2007

2008

2009

Notes

References

External links

Football in Kuwait
2000
2000s in Kuwaiti sport